The Hayward Journal is a now-defunct newspaper that used to serve Hayward, California. It was Hayward's first newspaper.

History 
Frank M. Dallam founded the paper in 1877  and edited it in an old storehouse until it was taken over by editor George Oakes in 1882.  During that period, it was occasionally rendered as Haywards Journal. When the Hayward Review was founded in the 1890s, the two papers sparred frequently on local issues.

By 1892, it was an independent weekly with a circulation of 250, publishing out of Hayward, California. In 1914, it went to publishing once a week instead of bi-weekly, and by the 1940s it had folded. The name was temporarily revived for an unrelated project in the mid-2000s.

References 

Defunct newspapers published in California